Charles O. Greenwood was an American farmer and a member of the Idaho House of Representatives from 1919 to 1920 and of the Idaho Senate  from 1927 to 1928.

The community of Greenwood, Idaho was named in honor of Greenwood and his wife Annie Pike Greenwood.

References
 

Year of birth missing 
Year of death missing 
Idaho state senators
Members of the Idaho House of Representatives